Heinz Günthardt was the defending champion of the singles event at the ABN World Tennis Tournament, but did not participate in this edition. First-seeded Jimmy Connors won the title after a victory in the final against second-seeded Gene Mayer 6–1, 2–6, 6–2.

Seeds

Draw

Finals

Upper half

Lower half

References

External links
 ITF tournament edition details

1981 ABN World Tennis Tournament